Meeri Wasberg (born 1973) is a Swedish politician, representing the Social Democrats. Wasberg, who has a background in the Swedish Union of Civil Servants, became a member of parliament in 2012, replacing the deceased parliamentarian Carina Moberg.

References

1973 births
Members of the Riksdag from the Social Democrats
Living people
Members of the Riksdag 2010–2014
Women members of the Riksdag
21st-century Swedish women politicians
People from Haninge Municipality